Dr. Hee is the second album by fusion band Tribal Tech, a project led by guitarist Scott Henderson and bassist Gary Willis.

Track listing  

 "Dr. Hee" – 6:52
 "Outskirts" – 5:47
 "Mango Prom" – 6:45
 "Solemn" – 2:55
 "Salsa Lastra" – 5:36
 "Twilight In Northridge" – 5:19
 "Seek And Find" – 4:52
 "The Rain" – 1:46
 "Ominous" – 5:06

Personnel 
 Bob Sheppard – saxophones, flutes
 Scott Henderson – guitars, guitar synthesizer
 Pat Coil – keyboards
 Will Boulware — keyboards (tracks 4, 7)
 Gary Willis – bass, synthesizer
 Steve Houghton – drums
 Brad Dutz – mallets, percussion, keyboards

References 

1987 albums
Tribal Tech albums
Relativity Records albums
Albums produced by Scott Henderson